First Methodist Episcopal Church and Parsonage (Community United Methodist Church or Williams Methodist Church) is a historic church at 127 W. Sherman Street in Williams, Arizona, United States.

It was built in 1891 and added to the National Register in 1984.

References

External links
 History of the Community United Methodist Church of Williams, Arizona

Methodist churches in Arizona
Churches on the National Register of Historic Places in Arizona
Gothic Revival church buildings in Arizona
Churches completed in 1891
Churches in Coconino County, Arizona
1891 establishments in Arizona Territory
National Register of Historic Places in Coconino County, Arizona
Williams, Arizona